SpongeBob Comics was a comic book series based on the animated TV show SpongeBob SquarePants, published by United Plankton Pictures and distributed by Bongo Comics. It was initially published every two months in the United States beginning in February 2011 and was published monthly from June 2012 to October 2018.

History

Originally, Stephen Hillenburg authored an educational comic book in 1989, called The Intertidal Zone, while he worked as a teacher of marine science at the Ocean Institute in Dana Point, California. This comic book depicted ocean life through anthropomorphic sea creatures, as the character of Bob the Sponge, a natural sponge with sunglasses who would become the first prototype of SpongeBob SquarePants. The universe of the SpongeBob SquarePants series is therefore directly inspired by The Intertidal Zone.

Following the launch of the SpongeBob SquarePants television series in 1999, Nickelodeon Magazine regularly published in its issues numerous comic stories from the series' universe. In 2009, the first comics book compilation of SpongeBob SquarePants comics, Comic Crazy!, was published, featuring various comic stories published in Nickelodeon Magazine. A second volume is published a year later. American distributor Tokyopop also adapted several episodes of the series into cine-manga comics.

In November 2010, United Plankton Pictures announced the upcoming release of a comic book series entirely dedicated to SpongeBob SquarePants and supporting characters, in association with Bongo Comics Group, a comic book publishing company founded in 1993 by The Simpsons and Futurama creator, Matt Groening. 

Debuting in February 2011, the series was published under the name of SpongeBob Comics, and was originally intended to be bimonthly, before becoming monthly from June 2012. Along with Hillenburg, independent comic creators who contributed to the first issue include James Kochalka, Hilary Barta, Graham Annable, Gregg Schigiel, and Jacob Chabot. Issue number 13, a Halloween special, was released in October 2012 featuring the work of such writers and artists as Stephen R. Bissette, Tony Millionaire, Al Jaffee, and Derek Drymon. Another Halloween-themed issue was released the following year featuring cartoonist Michael T. Gilbert.

In June 2013, United Plankton released SpongeBob Annual-Size Super-Giant Swimtacular #1. Managing editor Chris Duffy said the annual was "specially tailored" for superhero fans, with a cover by artist Jacob Chabot that was influenced by the Marvel Comics annuals of the 1960s. Collaborators for the book included Drymon, Kochalka, Barta, Ramona Fradon, Chuck Dixon, Jerry Ordway, and Vincent Deporter. A second superhero-inspired annual was released in June 2014.

In 2018, the series went on a publication hiatus after issue #85 due to Bongo Comics Group shutting down in October. Stephen Hillenburg died a month later, making a continuation of the series very uncertain.

Reception
In a review of the premiere issue, Chad Nevett of Comic Book Resources wrote: "SpongeBob Comics is effective at capturing the tone of the show and allowing the creators to present their own takes on the characters at times. It suffers sometimes from not being able to rely on the strengths of animation and, hopefully, will take advantage of the things that comics can do that animation can't."

Brigid Alverson of Comic Book Resources described SpongeBob Annual-Size Super-Giant Swimtacular #1 as "48 pages of pure summer vacation fun that is goofy enough to be fun for kids and smart enough to entertain adults as well." Writing for School Library Journal, J. Caleb Mozzocco said that although the longer page-count and higher price tag of the SpongeBob annual might make it a "less-than-ideal" jumping-on point, he added that "the superhero parody content ironically makes it an even easier comic for comics readers with no experience with the cartoon to enjoy."

Issues

Annuals

Free Comic Book Day (Freestyle Funnies)
"*" = Comic is a compilation of comics from main SpongeBob Comics series, and half of a Simpsons Free Comic Book Day issue.

Collected Editions

References

External links
SpongeBob at Bongo Comics

2011 comics debuts
Bongo Comics titles
Comics based on television series
SpongeBob SquarePants mass media and merchandise